Texas Star is a Ferris wheel at Fair Park, Dallas, Texas, US.

Texas Star, Texas star, or Texas Stars may also refer to:
 Texas star (fungus)
 Texas star, a common name for the flowering plant Sabatia campestris 
 Texas star, an alternative common name for the flowering plant Lindheimera texana 
 Texas Stars, an American Hockey League team
 An element on the Texan state flag, see Flag of Texas
 A classic American square dance

See also
 Dallas Stars, an NHL ice hockey team in Dallas, Texas
 Star, Texas,  an unincorporated community in Mills County, Texas
 Lone Star (disambiguation)
 Texas (disambiguation)
 Star (disambiguation)